Arjut is a town in the Lori Province of Armenia.

Notable natives 
 Namig Mammadov – Azerbaijani public figure

References

External links 

Populated places in Lori Province